A labial fricative is a fricative consonant, whose articulation involves the lips. Several kinds can be distinguished based on whether the articulation involves only the lips or either the teeth or the tongue:
Bilabial fricatives (articulated with both lips):
 Voiceless bilabial fricative 
 Voiced bilabial fricative 
 Labiodental fricatives (articulated with the lower lip touching against the upper teeth):
 Voiceless labiodental fricative 
 Voiced labiodental fricative 
 Linguolabial fricatives (articulated with the tip or blade of the tongue against the upper lip:
 Voiceless linguolabial fricative  or 
 Voiced linguolabial fricative  or 

Labial consonants
Fricative consonants